Kim Jung-won (born 20 January 1973) is a North Korean long-distance runner. He competed in the men's marathon at the 1996 Summer Olympics and the 2000 Summer Olympics. Kim is married to fellow marathoner Jong Song-ok since March 2001. The couple's first child, Hyo-il, was born in 2002. Jong stated that North Korean leader Kim Jong-il personally suggested the name.

References

Works cited

External links
 

1973 births
Living people
Athletes (track and field) at the 1996 Summer Olympics
Athletes (track and field) at the 2000 Summer Olympics
North Korean male long-distance runners
North Korean male marathon runners
Olympic athletes of North Korea
Place of birth missing (living people)
Asian Games medalists in athletics (track and field)
Asian Games bronze medalists for North Korea
Athletes (track and field) at the 1998 Asian Games
Medalists at the 1998 Asian Games
20th-century North Korean people